Heinz-Günther Lehmann (6 March 1923 in Zeitz – 24 June 2006 in Göppingen) was a German swimmer who competed in the 1952 Summer Olympics.

References

1923 births
2006 deaths
People from Zeitz
German male swimmers
German male freestyle swimmers
Olympic swimmers of Germany
Swimmers at the 1952 Summer Olympics
European Aquatics Championships medalists in swimming
Sportspeople from Saxony-Anhalt